Kamal Heer (born Kamaljeet Singh Heer) is an Indian born Canadian musician. He is the younger brother of Manmohan Waris and Sangtar, two other esteemed musicians. His live performances showcase his virtuosity with taan and his command of the art of traditional Punjabi music. All three Heer brothers are behind the formulation of Punjabi Virsa shows all over the world. These shows have become internationally famous. Also a talented composer, Kamal Heer has collaborated with his brother Sangtar to write music for their brother Waris.

Career
Kamal Heer was born in the village of Halluwal, Punjab, India. He learned music from Ustaad Jaswant Singh Bhanwra. After Kamal's family moved to Canada in 1990, he and his older brother Sangtar started composing music. In 1993 they composed music for Manmohan Waris's album, Gaairan Naal Penghan Jhotdiye, which became a huge hit. Heer continued composing until 1999.

Heer's debut album, Kamli, was released in 2000, which was mostly not a success. In 2002 he released Masti-Kanthay Vala, which became very successful especially "Kanthay Vala". He released Masti 2 in 2003 which contained the tracks "Nachne Nu Kare Mera Ji", "Kinnu Yaad Kar Kar Hasdi", "Hick Da Taveet" and "Ishq Ne Kamle Karte".

Heer continued his success with Punjabi Virsa 2004 - Toronto Live, a live album recorded in Toronto, Ontario, Canada with his two brothers. The success of this live album led to Punjabi Virsa concerts happening every year, when he toured with his brothers all around the world. Punjabi Virsa 2005, Punjabi Virsa 2006 and Punjabi Virsa 2008 were also recorded live. After the moderately successful studio albums Masti Three (2006) and Chan Jiha Gabhru (2007), Heer released Jinday Ni Jinday in 2009. This album is considered his most popular to date. After the Punjabi Virsa 2009 tour of Australia and New Zealand, there was Punjabi Virsa 2010.

Heer released the next live concert, Punjabi Virsa 2011 Melbourne, with Manmohan Waris and Sangtar. The show was widely appreciated. In 2012 he released  two singles, "Club Wich" and "Google". In 2013 he released another live concert, Punjabi Virsa 2013, with Manmohan Waris and Sangtar. In February 2014, Heer put out the collaborative album Unity with Waris and Sangtar.

Discography

Studio albums

Collaborations

Live albums

Compilations

Music videos

Non-album singles

Collaborative singles

Videography

Live performances

Concerts and tours
In August 2003 he appeared at Shaunki Mela 2003, a Special Tribute Concert for Dhadi Amar Singh Shaunki, with his two brothers and Gurpreet Ghuggi.

The three brothers tour every year
 Punjabi Virsa 2004
 Punjabi Virsa 2005
 Punjabi Virsa 2006
 Punjabi Virsa 2007
 Punjabi Virsa 2008
 Punjabi Virsa 2009
 Punjabi Virsa 2010
 Punjabi Virsa 2011
 Punjabi Virsa 2012
 Punjabi Virsa 2014
 Punjabi Virsa 2014
 Punjabi Virsa 2015
 Punjabi Virsa 2016
 Punjabi Virsa 2017

Other

Awards and nominations

References

External links
 Kamal Heer on Facebook

1973 births
Living people
People from Surrey, British Columbia
Canadian musicians of Indian descent
Canadian people of Punjabi descent
Bhangra (music)
Canadian male singers
Indian emigrants to Canada
Indian male singers
Punjabi-language singers
Punjabi people
Punjabi Virsa
Waris Brothers